Saint John's Senior Secondary School in Kota, Rajasthan, India, is situated at Bundi Road. It is an English medium institution. The building is spread over five acres of lush green surroundings. 

The school was founded in 1973 in a small building of Civil Lines, with 80 students. It has grown into a senior secondary school affiliated to the Central Board of Secondary Education, Delhi.

No child is denied admission on the grounds of poverty, caste, creed or religion.

References

External links

Official website

Schools in Rajasthan
Educational institutions established in 1973
Education in Kota, Rajasthan
1973 establishments in Rajasthan